Käthe or Kathe is a given name. Notable people with the name include:

Käthe Dorsch (1890–1957), German actress
Käthe Gold (1907–1997), Austrian actress
Käthe Grasegger, later Deuschl (1917–2001), German alpine skier
Kathe Green (born 1944), American actress, model and singer
Käthe Haack (1897–1986), German actress
Käthe Hoffmann, German botanist who discovered and catalogued many plant species in New Guinea and South East Asia
Käthe Köhler (born 1913), German diver who competed in the 1936 Summer Olympics
Kathe Koja (born 1960), American writer
Käthe Kollwitz (1867–1945), German painter, printmaker, and sculptor
Käthe Krauß (1906–1970), German athlete, 1936 Olympic bronze medallist in 100 m
Käthe Pohland, East German sprint canoeist who competed in the late 1960s
Käthe Schirmacher (1865–1930), German writer, journalist, women's rights activist and journalist
Käthe Sohnemann (born 1913), German gymnast who competed in the 1936 Summer Olympics
Käthe von Nagy (1904–1973), Hungarian actress

See also
Käthe Kollwitz Museum (Berlin), with a large collection of works by the German artist Käthe Kollwitz
Käthe Kollwitz Museum (Cologne), with a large collection of works by the German artist Käthe Kollwitz
Käthe Wohlfahrt, German company that sells Christmas decorations and articles
Kathe Mou Skepsi, the fifth studio album by Greek musical group C:Real
Ondu Muttina Kathe, Indian movie directed by actor/director Shankar Nag, starring Dr. Rajkumar in the lead role
Ondu Premada Kathe (Kannada: ಒಂದು ಪ್ರೇಮದ ಕಥೆ), Kannada film is directed by S.M.Joe Simon
Strange Angels (Kathe Koja novel), 1994 novel by American author Kathe Koja published by Delacorte Press
Tabarana Kathe (Kannada: ತಬರನ ಕಥೆ), Kannada language film released in 1987 directed by Girish Kasaravalli

German feminine given names

da:Kathe